Privolzhsk is a town and the administrative center of Privolzhsky District in Ivanovo Oblast, Russia, located on the Shacha River (right tributary of the Volga)  northeast of Ivanovo, the administrative center of the oblast. Population:

History
It has been known since 1485 as the village of Yakovlevskoye Bolshoye. The town of Privolzhsk was formed by merging the village of Yakovlevskoye and the neighboring settlements in 1938.

Administrative and municipal status
Within the framework of administrative divisions, Privolzhsk serves as the administrative center of Privolzhsky District, to which it is directly subordinated. Prior to the adoption of the Law #145-OZ On the Administrative-Territorial Division of Ivanovo Oblast in December 2010, it used to be incorporated separately as an administrative unit with the status equal to that of the districts.

As a municipal division, the town of Privolzhsk is incorporated within Privolzhsky Municipal District as Privolzhskoye Urban Settlement.

References

Notes

Sources

Cities and towns in Ivanovo Oblast
Nerekhtsky Uyezd